The Nduga hostage crisis began on 7 February 2023 when Free Papua Movement (OPM) insurgents attacked a plane and took its pilot and all five passengers hostage. While the passengers were soon released, New Zealander pilot Philip Mark Mehrtens remains in captivity.

Background 
On 4 February 2023 fifteen civilian workers building a puskesmas clinic for the district had been threatened by the Free Papua Movement (OPM), which alleged that some of them were spies of the Indonesian government, as some of them were allegedly not carrying their national identity cards.

Timeline 
On 7 February 2023 at 06:17 a.m. WIT, a Pilatus PC-6 Porter aircraft with the registration number PK-BVY belonging to Susi Air arrived from Timika to Paro airport, Nduga. Shortly after landing, it lost contact with air traffic control. A search was conducted from the air, which soon sighted a burning aircraft. The fate of the New Zealander pilot and the Indonesian passengers (five adults and an infant) was not known at this point.

A few hours after the sighting, Indonesian military stated that it is likely that the passengers had been taken hostage by the OPM, who were also accused of setting the plane on fire. On the same day, OPM spokesman Sebby Sambom confirmed these allegations, claiming that the operation was led by Egianus Kogoya, a local commander. OPM stated that the passengers, who were Indonesian nationals, had already been released, but that the pilot would only be delivered if the Indonesian government recognised the independence of West Papua, and otherwise would be killed. By then, the hostage had been taken further away from the area according to the organisation. OPM considered New Zealand, Indonesia, Australia, Europe, and the United States to be responsible. In addition, OPM took hostage the workers who had been building the puskesmas clinic.  

By 8 February 2023, civilian workers had been evacuated from the area by the Indonesian National Police. Units of police and army were deployed to evacuate the fifteen civilian workers with three helicopters. The evacuation operation was slowed down by bad weather and had to be suspended, but was later completed. In the evening of 8 February, the police claimed that all passengers of the plane had been evacuated.

On 14 February, members of the West Papua National Liberation Army (TPNPB), the armed wing of the OPM, released several photos and videos of the New Zealand pilot Phillip Mark Mehrtens to the Associated Press. The rebel spokesperson Sebby Sambom stated that his group had released the five civilian hostages since they were indigenous Papuans. In their videos, the rebels reiterated their demand for West Papuan independence. On 23 February, Indonesian authorities claimed that Kogoya had offered to exchange firearms and ammunition for Mehrtens' release, and that the offer had been rejected.

Response

Indonesian government and military
On 8 February the Indonesian Ministry of Transportation closed the airport down as the remains of the burned aircraft could not be moved and were blocking the runway. On the same day Commander of the Indonesian National Armed Forces Yudo Margono stated that previously they have warned Susi Air to not conduct flights to Nduga as the area is dangerous with minimal security forces. He also claimed not to have known that Susi Air had been regularly flying to Nduga.  This despite Susi Air having flown regular, scheduled flights to Paro and nearby Kilmid for years on a government contract for subsidized air services.

On 14 February, Indonesian coordinating minister for Political, Security and Legal Affairs Mohammad Mahfud confirmed that the Indonesian Government was working to secure Mehrtens' release and reiterated that West Papua was part of Indonesia. Papua police chief Mathius Fakhiri also confirmed that local authorities were working with tribal and religious community leaders to negotiate with the rebels. That same week, an Indonesian military spokesperson told the Australian Broadcasting Corporation (ABC) that Indonesian security forces were working to identify Mehrtens' exact location before attempting to rescue him. The New Zealand Ministry of Foreign Affairs and Trade (MFAT) confirmed that it was working with the Indonesian Government and other agencies to secure Mehrens' release and stated that his family had asked for privacy.

By 17 February, Papua Police chief Inspector Matthius Fakhiri issued a statement that it believed they had identified the location where Mehrten was being held hostage. Papua Police dispatched a negotiation team consisting of local politicians to make contact with TPNPB forces. 

Following Mehrten's kidnapping, the Indonesian National Armed Forces (TNI) deployed two battalions of the elite special forces Kopassus' Unit 81 counter-terrorism force to the southern Papuan city of Timika, which became a staging post for the rescue operation. By 17 March 2023, the Papuan rebels led by Egianus Kogoya and Mehrten had retreated into West Papua's Central Highlands, having spent the past three weeks eluding them. Commander of the Indonesian National Armed Forces Admiral Yudo Margono reiterated Indonesian authorities' commitment towards a peaceful solution Margono but declined an offer from New Zealand Ambassador Kevin Burnett to facilitate low-level negotiations between OPM intermediaries, local district officials and religious leaders. According to Indonesian Police, Kogoya killed an eight-year old boy after the child's father, a local village head, had refused to supply the group with food.

Asia Times also reported that Indonesians had evacuated thousands of people from around Paro airport, Ndago Regency, Lanny Jaya Regency, and Puncak in an effort to deny Kogoya community assistance. In addition, Indonesian troops blocked key positions in the Central Highlands in order to prevent Kogoya's brother Undinus from assisting Kogoya's group.

West Papuan liberation movement
On 24 February 2023, United Liberation Movement for West Papua's (ULMWP) leader Berry Wenda called for Mehrten's captors to release him.

Reference

2023 in international relations
2023 crimes in Indonesia
Conflicts in 2023
February 2023 events in Indonesia
Hostage taking in Indonesia
Kidnappings in Indonesia
Papua conflict
Indonesia–New Zealand relations
History of Highland Papua